Arctia souliei is a moth in the family Erebidae. It was described by Charles Oberthür in 1903. It is found in Tibet and Sichuan in China.

This species was formerly a member of the genus Platarctia, but was moved to Arctia along with the other species of the genera Acerbia, Pararctia, Parasemia, Platarctia, and Platyprepia.

References

Moths described in 1903
Arctiina